Wila Qullu (Aymara, wila red, blood-red, qullu mountain, also spelled Wila Kkollu, Willa Kkollu) is a  mountain in the southern part of the Chilla-Kimsa Chata mountain range in the Andes of Bolivia. It is located in the La Paz Department, Pacajes Province, Waldo Ballivián Municipality. This is where the Ch'alla Jawira originates. Its waters flow to the Desaguadero River.

References 

Mountains of La Paz Department (Bolivia)